The following is a list of Wales women's national rugby union team international matches.

Overall 
Wales overall international match record against all nations, updated to 13 November 2021, is as follows:

Full internationals

1980s

1990s

2000s

2010s

2020s

Other matches

Notes 

 Wales only sent its development squad to the 2007 FIRA tournament.

References 

Women's rugby union in Wales